Anterior nasal may refer to:

 Anterior nasal aperture 
 Anterior nasal spine